Selma Archerd ( Fenning; February 26, 1925) is an American former actress, known for her roles in Die Hard (1988), Lethal Weapon (1987) and Lethal Weapon 3 (1992). She has also appeared on The Brady Bunch, A Very Brady Christmas, and The Brady Bunch Movie.

Archerd married columnist Army Archerd after divorce ended her first marriage.

Filmography
Lethal Weapon (1987) - Policewoman
Die Hard (1988) - Hostage #1
Lethal Weapon 3 (1992) - Officer Selma

References

External links 
 

1925 births
Living people
20th-century American actresses
Actresses from Newark, New Jersey
American film actresses